The Rainbow 100 is a microcomputer introduced by Digital Equipment Corporation (DEC) in 1982. This desktop unit had a monitor similar to the VT220 and a dual-CPU box with both  Zilog Z80 and  Intel 8088 CPUs.
The Rainbow 100 was a triple-use machine: VT100 mode (industry standard terminal for interacting with DEC's own VAX), 8-bit CP/M mode (using the Z80), and CP/M-86 or MS-DOS mode using the 8088.

Models 

The Rainbow came in three models, the 100A, 100B and 100+. The "A" model was the first released, followed later by the "B" model.  The most noticeable differences between the two models were the firmware and slight hardware changes.  The systems were referred to with model numbers PC-100A and PC-100B respectively; later  were also designated PC-100B2. The system included a user-changeable ROM chip in a special casing to support their keyboard layout and language of the boot screen. On the 100A, the ROMs only supported three languages.

PC-100A 

The "A" model was the first produced by Digital.  The distinguishing characteristic of the "A" model from an end-user perspective was that the earlier firmware did not support booting from a hard disk.  Other distinguishing hardware features included the three 2764 (8 KB) ROM chips holding the system firmware and the case fan/power supply combinations.  In addition, the 100A was unable to move its hardware interrupt vectors to avoid the conflict with MS-DOS soft INT 21, etc. DOS had to take unusual actions to distinguish between the hard and soft vectors. The Rainbow 100A initially only supported  of RAM total, but the limitation in the memory expansion slot was later worked around with a special adapter card, though the maximum was limited to

PC-100B 

The "B" model followed the "A" model, and introduced a number of changes.  The "B" model featured the ability to boot from a hard disk (referred to as the Winchester drive) via the boot menu due to updated firmware.  The hardware changes included bigger firmware stored on two  and an improved case fan/power supply. The firmware allowed selection of the boot screen language and keyboard layout, eliminating the need to switch ROM. The "B" model also allowed remapping of hardware interrupts to be more compatible with MS-DOS. The B model also improved the memory expansion slot to allow a maximum configuration of 

The "100+" model was actually a marketing designation signifying that the system shipped with a hard drive installed; the "100+" and "B" models were identical in all other respects.  When a hard-disk option was installed on the Rainbow, the kit included the 100+ emblem for the computer's case.

Hardware

CPUs 

The Rainbow contained two separate data buses controlled by the Zilog Z80 and the Intel 8088 respectively.  The buses exchanged information via a shared  memory.

The 8088 bus was used for control of all other subsystems, including graphics, hard disk access, and communications. While it may have been theoretically possible to load Z80 binary code into the Rainbow to execute alongside 8088 code, this procedure has never been demonstrated.

The 8088 could be upgraded to the faster NEC V20 chip. This gave about 10-15% speed improvement, but required changes to the system's ROMs to fix two timing loops.

Memory 

The 100A model shipped with  memory on the motherboard, while the 100B had 128 KB memory on the motherboard. The difference in max memory was due to the difference in initial memory configuration.

Storage

Floppy disk drives 

The floppy disk drives, known as the RX50, accepted proprietary  single-sided, quad-density 5¼-inch diskettes.  Initial versions of the operating systems on the Rainbow did not allow for low-level formatting, requiring users to purchase RX50 media from Digital Equipment Corporation.  The high cost of media ($5 per disk) led to accusations of vendor "lock-in" against Digital.  However, later versions of MS-DOS and CP/M allowed formatting of diskettes. Formatting software for "normal" diskettes was also made available by third parties.

Of note was the single motor used to drive both disk drives via a common spindle, which were arranged one on top of the other. That meant that one disk went underneath the first but inserted upside-down. This earned the diskette drive the nickname "toaster". The unusual orientation confused many first-time users, who would complain that the machine would not read the disk. This was remedied later by placing a red arrow on the diskette slots and on the top of the diskettes to indicate which side of the diskette to be inserted into each diskette drive.

Hard disks 

Digital Equipment Corporation produced a Winchester disk controller capable of controlling hard disks compatible with the ST-506 interface.

Third-party hard-disk controllers were also available, including a dual winchester support from CHS

Graphics 

The base Rainbow system was capable of displaying text in 80×24- or 132×24-character format in monochrome only.  The system could apply attributes to text including bolding, double-width, and double-height-double-width.

The graphics option was a user-installable module that added graphics and color display capabilities to the Rainbow system. The Graphic module was based on a NEC 7220 graphic display controller (GDC) and an 8×64 KB DRAM video memory.

Due to the design of the graphics system, the Rainbow was capable of controlling two monitors simultaneously, one displaying graphics and another displaying text.

Display 

The base Rainbow system generates a TTL 15 kHz composite-video signal compatible with RS-170 (NTSC) in monochrome mode.  With the inclusion of the graphics option, the Rainbow could also output sync-on-green RGB video signals at TTL levels.  The Rainbow was most often coupled with the 12-inch VR201 monochrome monitor or the 13-inch VR241 color monitor, both produced by Digital Equipment Corporation. The Rainbow was unique, in that the power for the monochrome monitor was supplied through the single video cable, eliminating the need for a separate power cable.

Keyboard 
The Rainbow 100 and the other two microcomputers which DEC announced at the same time (DECmate II and Pro-350) had two quirks that annoyed conservative users.  The LK201 keyboard used a new layout that made some Teletype Model 33 and VT100 users unhappy.  However, the VT220 style of this keyboard can clearly be seen in the layout of the enhanced 101-key keyboard adopted by IBM in 1985.

Third-party 

Third-party upgrades were also available, including an 80286 (286) processor upgrade (Turbow-286), a 3.5-inch disk adapter kit (IDrive), and a battery-backed clock chip (ClikClok), all from Suitable Solutions.

In 1984, the first computer support for Native American languages began with the Rainbow 100. Rock Point Community School on the Navajo reservation in Arizona commissioned a ROM chip for the Navajo language, enabling the school to create bilingual computer programs.

Univation produced a number of products for the Rainbow as well. They offered add-in memory cards, hard disk controllers and LAN cards. The Univation disk interface was SASI/SCSI-1, but not software compatible with DEC's Winchester Disk option. It was based on a design by Xebec.

C.H.S. Created a dual-Winchester controller for the DEC Rainbow as well. It was compatible enough with the DEC's disk controller one could boot off it on the 100B/100+/190. Like DEC's offering, it was based on Western Digital's WD1010 chip. However, additional drivers were needed to access the second hard drive.

REC of Switzerland created a SCSI card for the Rainbow.

There was an "ACT Winchester Option" available in Australia for which drivers have recently surfaced.

Duncan MacDonald, Inc offered a 20MB Floppy tape cartridge using a rebranded CIPHER Data Products Model 525 floppy-tape cartridge tape drive. It used 3M DC600A tapes and could back up a 20MB RD31 in about 30 minutes. It included software to backup MS-DOS, CP/M and CCP/M partitions. List price in 1987 was $1200. In addition, Duncan MacDonald, Inc provided MFM disks in 20MB, 40MB and 67MB that used the same disks that DEC sold for much more, and provided a nice steel-cabinet with power supply so the Rainbow's power supply wouldn't be overtaxed by the power requirements of larger disks.

DEC Option Table 

Here's the various options you could get for the Rainbow that were hardware. Country kits not yet listed.

Data compiled from a number of sources including

Software 
The Rainbow runs the CP/M operating system, which detects whether software is written for 8-bit CP/M and CP/M-86 and runs it on the appropriate processor. DEC later released MS-DOS, but little DOS software was released on Rainbow media. While it provided the same MS-DOS functions that IBM's PC DOS did, it lacked the IBM PC's video and keyboard ROM BIOS interface which most MS-DOS software relied upon, limiting the commercial software that would run. Towards the end of its life, Rainbow users were able to run some IBM PC-compatible MS-DOS software using an emulation application called Code Blue, though it emulated only the IBM PC's BIOS and some of the hardware, so programs that accessed the video cards directly would not work very well.

MS-DOS compatibility was added late in the design, so hardware interrupts and MS-DOS software interrupts overlapped.  One DEC documentation pack for developers included a listing of Microsoft assembly code to handle this.  The theory was that hardware interrupts would interrupt again but software interrupts would only happen once. The Rainbow 100B fixed this overlap in hardware by changes to the board design that allowed the OS to move the hardware interrupts. This means that the MS-DOS 3.10b version for the Rainbow can only run on the Rainbow 100B.

DEC itself ported Microsoft Windows 1.0 to the Rainbow.  The Suitable Solutions Turbow-286 board could run a modified version of Windows 3.0.

Software bundled with DEC Rainbow floor model included:
Microsoft MBasic-86  BASIC interpreter for Rainbow 100
WordStar  developed by Micro Pro for Rainbow 100

Documentation
Rainbow 100 Technical Manual
Getting Started with Rainbow 100
MBasic-86 User's Guide Digital Equipment Corporation Distributed
WordStar User's Guide for Rainbow 100
License and Software Product Description
These documents come in booklets contained inside two hard case boxes, with the DEC logo.

Problems
The Rainbow used a distinct version of MS-DOS, so it was not completely software- or hardware-compatible with the IBM PC or PC DOS. The expectation was for programs to target the MS-DOS interface and not the underlying hardware. However, many significant commercial software products were writing directly to the hardware for a variety of reasons, including performance. After the Compaq Portable and other clones, the market expectation was that all MS-DOS versions would be fully IBM PC compatible. Later, Microsoft would stop licensing distinctive OEM versions and sell standardized MS-DOS 5.0 at retail. While "Code Blue" did a good job at emulating the IBM BIOS, its inability to trap references to the video and other hardware limited what would run on the Rainbow. The FOSSIL TSR allowed several terminal programs and editors to run on the IBM-PC, Rainbow, and other early 8088/8086 computers, but its limited adoption hampered its usefulness. Various other hacks allowed popular programs such as Turbo Pascal and Turbo C to run. Such patches circulated, but new releases made these difficult to keep up with, and over time these hacks dried up (the online archives have very little new after 1991 or 1992, although some of that may be due to the RABIT TSR, which solved the problem generically for all Borland products).

The DEC Rainbow 100 MS-DOS did support FAT formatted floppies. They were FAT12 format on 80-track, single-sided, quad-density 5.25" drives. The first two tracks were reserved for the boot loader, but didn't contain an MBR nor a BPB (MS-DOS 2.x and 3.10 on the Rainbow used a static in-memory BPB instead). The boot sector (track 0, side 0, sector 1) was Z80 code beginning with DI 0xF3. The 8088 bootstrap was loaded by the Z80. Track 1, side 0, sector 2 starts with the Media/FAT ID byte 0xFA. Unformatted disks use 0xE5 instead. The file system starts on track 2, side 0, sector 1. There are 2 copies of the FAT and 96 entries in the root directory. In addition, there is a physical to logical track mapping to effect a 2:1 sector interleaving. The disks were formatted with the physical sectors in order numbered 1 to 10 on each track after the reserved tracks, but the logical sectors from 1 to 10 were stored in physical sectors 1, 6, 2, 7, 3, 8, 4, 9, 5, 10. This makes it hard to create Rainbow disk images since all existing tools assume there will be an MBR with a BPB, and required various hacks to make up for the lack of on-disk BPB.

The DEC Rainbow 100 had no general expansion bus. Instead, it had a number of expansion slots that could be used for a single purpose only: extra memory, graphics, rx-50 floppy controller. One slot was originally designed for a DMA enabled serial card, but hard disk controllers were used there instead because DEC bet wrong on which was more important. Univation produced an Ethernet card that could boot the Rainbow over the network for that slot. It stacked to allow both hard disk and ethernet in the same box, but it cost $750 which was prohibitively expensive so few Rainbows had ethernet. While the software incompatibilities were bad, the lack of expansion hardware flexibility was worse, and the inability to use ISA cards, despite their flaws at the time, played a significant role in the Rainbow fading from the scene.

Legacy
The Multi Emulator Super System can run the Rainbow-specific Windows 1.0.

The Rainbow 100 plays a small but important role in the creation of the FidoNet system. A computer club in St. Louis was in the process of setting up a BBS system using CBBS on CP/M when they learned that DEC would be giving the club a Rainbow 100 for free. The group planned on starting the BBS on this machine as soon as it arrived; but, when it did, they found that the Z80 did not have access to the serial ports. Casting about for a new BBS platform that ran on DOS, they learned of FidoBBS and arranged to have its developer port the serial drivers to the Rainbow platform. This ran up considerable phone bills sending emails and file transfers between St. Louis and the developer in San Francisco, and the developer produced FidoNet as a method of automating exchanges late at night when phone rates were lower.

Piers Anthony wrote many of his books from the '80s on his DEC Rainbow.

The DEC Rainbow can be seen in the films Ghostbusters, Beverly Hills Cop, and Firestarter.

Michael Paré watches a TV commercial for "The Rainbow" in The Philadelphia Experiment.

References

External links 

 
 
 Uppsala University Update Computer Club Rainbow archives
 Vintage-Computer page on the DEC Rainbow 100
 Rainbow 100 Frequently Asked Questions

Personal computers
DEC computers
Computer-related introductions in 1982